The Velvet Touch of Los Straitjackets is the third studio album by American instrumental rock band Los Straitjackets, released in 1999 by Yep Roc. It was recorded between September and December 1998, produced by Ben Vaughn, and engineered by Mark Linett.

Critical reception
Exclaim! wrote that "this third disc is a short one, but it's long on value, blending equal parts Hi-Test surf music and gentle, tasteful ballads." The Pittsburgh Post-Gazette wrote that "the hooks are inventive, insistent and sometimes even funny." The Detroit Metro Times called the band's cover of "My Heart Will Go On" "delightfully absurd."

Track listing

Personnel
Los Straitjackets
Danny Amis – guitar
Eddie Angel – guitar
Pete Curry – bass
Scott Esbeck – bass
Jimmy "L. J." Lester – drums
Guest musicians
Jeff Sudakin – keyboards, orchestration, sound design
Jay Mason – clarinet, saxophone
Darrel Gardner – trumpet
Additional personnel
Ben Vaughn – production
Mark Linett – engineering
Joe Gastwirt – mastering
George Miller – artwork

References

Los Straitjackets albums
1999 albums
Albums produced by Ben Vaughn